Chung Yuan Christian University Chang Ching Yu Memorial Library is the library at Chung Yuan Christian University in Zhongli District, Taoyuan City, Taiwan.

History 
The library was established in 1955, the construction of the current library building began in October 1983, and was completed in 1985. Architecture and design work were done by Wang Chiu-Hwa and Joshua Jih Pan. Later, to commemorate the deceased former Chairman Chang Ching Yu, the board of directors decided to name the library "Chang Ching Yu Memorial Library".

Architecture 
The library is a six-floor building with five floors above ground level and one basement. The gross area of construction is about 11,900 square meters.

Floor plan

References

External links

Official Website

1955 establishments in Taiwan
Academic libraries in Taiwan
Library buildings completed in 1985
Libraries established in 1955
Libraries in Taoyuan City
Buildings and structures in Taoyuan City